The name Isobel has been used for four Tropical Cyclones in the Australian region of the South-East Indian Ocean.

 Cyclone Isobel (1974) – was no threat to land.
 Cyclone Isobel (1985) – did not affect land.
 Cyclone Isobel (1996) –  did not pass close to any land.
 Tropical Low Isobel (2007) – made landfall along the north-west coast of Western Australia; its remnants merged with a deep low-pressure system and pummeled the region with torrential rains and high winds.

See also
 List of storms named Isabel – a similar name which was used twice in the Atlantic Ocean and once in the South-West Indian Ocean.

Australian region cyclone set index articles